Paloich refers to an area in South Sudan in Upper Nile State that includes oil-related Paloich Airport (also spelled as Palouge Airport) and adjacent Palogue oil field.

The variations of the name of the place vary greatly and include: Paloich, Palogue, Palouge, Baloish, Paloug, Paluge, Phaloich, Phalogue, Phalouge, Baloish, Phaloug, Phaluge, Paloch and others.

There also seems to be a Paloich Market. and Palouge Power Plant.

See also 
 List of power stations in Sudan

References 

Populated places in Upper Nile (state)